Despot Jovan may refer to:

 Jovan Oliver, Serbian nobleman, awarded with the title of despot c. 1346
 Jovan Uglješa, Serbian nobleman, awarded with the title of despot c. 1365
 Jovan Dragaš, Serbian nobleman, awarded with the title of despot c. 1365
 Jovan Branković, Serbian titular despot, proclaimed c. 1494
 Jovan Berislavić, Serbian titular despot, proclaimed c. 1504

See also
 Despot (title) 
 Despot (disambiguation)
 Jovan (given name)
 Despot Stefan (disambiguation)

Serbian nobility